The European Union (EU) and the Republic of Korea (South Korea) are important trade partners: Korea is the EU's ninth largest export market for goods, and the EU is Korea's third largest export destination. The two have signed a free trade agreement which came into effect at end of 2011. Furthermore, South Korea is the only country in the world with the three agreements covering economics, politics and security in effect as of 2020.

Agreements

The first EU–South Korea agreement was Agreement on Co-operation and Mutual Administrative Assistance in Customs Matters (signed on 13 May 1997). This agreement allows the sharing of competition policy between the two parties. The second agreement, the Framework Agreement on Trade and Co-operation (enacted on 1 April 2001). The framework attempts to increase co-operation on several industries, including transport, energy, science and technology, industry, environment and culture.

Following extended negotiations, the EU and Korea in 2010 signed a new framework agreement and a free trade agreement (FTA) which was the EU's first FTA with an Asian country and removes virtually all tariffs and many non-tariff barriers. On the basis of this, the EU and Korea decided in October 2010 to upgrade their relationship to a Strategic Partnership. These agreements came into force in 2011.

Meetings
EU-Korea summits have taken place in 2002 (Copenhagen), 2004 (Hanoi) and 2006 (Helsinki) on the sidelines of ASEM meetings. In 2009, the first stand alone bilateral meeting was held in Seoul. The European Parliament delegation for relations with Korea visits the country twice a year for discussions with their Korean counterparts. Meetings at foreign minister level take place at least once a year on the sidelines of ASEAN regional form meetings, however meetings between the Korean foreign minister and the EU High Representative have occurred more frequently, for example at G20 meetings. Ad hoc meetings between officials occur nearly monthly.

Trade
Trade in goods between the two parties was about €100 billion in 2017. The EU is the third largest importer of South Korean goods, while South Korea is the ninth largest importer of EU goods.

See also
 Foreign relations of South Korea
 Foreign relations of the European Union
 North Korea–European Union relations

References

External links
 EU delegation to Korea

 
European Union
Third-country relations of the European Union